Matrika Prasad Koirala formed his second government in 1953 after his appointment by King Tribhuvan. The cabinet was expanded in February 1954 to include Nepal National Congress, Nepal Praja Parishad and Nepali Jan Congress.

Matrika Prasad Koirala resigned on 11 April 1955 and his government was followed by the direct rule of King Mahendra and his advisors.

Cabinet

June 1953 – February 1954

February 1954 – April 1955

References 

1953 in Nepal
Cabinet of Nepal
Cabinets established in 1953
Cabinets disestablished in 1955
1953 establishments in Nepal
1955 disestablishments in Nepal